Kyle Fletcher (born 24 December 1998) is an Australian professional wrestler currently appearing for New Japan Pro-Wrestling, where he was an inaugural Strong Openweight Tag Team Champion and Revolution Pro Wrestling, where he is a two-time Undisputed British Tag Team Champion.

He and fellow Australian wrestler Mark Davis team as a tag team as Aussie Open, where both are members of the United Empire stable. He has also made appearances in All Elite Wrestling and several British Independent promotions, such as Progress Wrestling and Attack! Pro Wrestling. Fletcher commonly wrestled in the Australian Independent circuit, for companies such as Melbourne City Wrestling.

Professional wrestling career

Early career (2014–2016)
Fletcher debuted in July 2014, wrestling around the New South Wales state, wrestling for companies such as Melbourne City Wrestling.

Aussie Open & Freelancing (2017–Present)

In May 2017, Fletcher traveled to the United Kingdom to work on their independent scene, commonly working for WhatCulture Pro-Wrestling (WCPW) and Attack! Pro Wrestling. During July of the same year, Fletcher teamed up with Fellow Australian wrestler Mark Davis as The Aussie Assault. The two commonly teamed from there on and eventually changed, their team name to Aussie Open, competing together across the UK. Fletcher made an appearance for the Chikara promotion. Aussie Open also competed in Europe, for promotions such as Westside Xtreme Wrestling. In August, Aussie Open made their debuts for Revolution Pro Wrestling and continued to work with them in the long term. This meant that they would work with New Japan Pro-Wrestling talent due to their working agreement with RevPro. Aussie Open commonly faced talent such as Roppongi 3K, who were on a learning excursion from New Japan. During their tour of the UK in May 2018, Aussie Open made their Ring of Honor debut, leading to Dalton Castle's "boys". In March 2019, Aussie Open won the wXw World Tag Team Championship, before losing them to Ilja Dragunov and WALTER, ending their reign at 147 days. They regained the championships 41 days later but had to vacate them after 14 days, due to Davis suffering a leg injury. In May 2019, Aussie Open achieved a massive victory, by defeating NJPW's Suzuki-gun (Minoru Suzuki and Zack Sabre Jr.), to win the British Tag Team Championships for the first time. They lost the titles to Sha Samuels and Josh Bodom, ending their reign at 50 days.

Appearances for New Japan Pro-Wrestling and United Empire (2019–Present)

Aussie Open made their NJPW debut at NJPW Royal Quest on August 31, losing in an IWGP Tag Team Championship match to Guerrillas of Destiny (Tama Tonga and Tanga Loa). Aussie Open wrestled infrequently in 2020, due to the COVID-19 pandemic. In February 2021, Aussie Open returned to Australia, for the first time as a team, wrestling on several independent shows. Aussie Open returned to RevPro on August 21, 2021, and regained the British Tag Team Championships the following month. On September 19, at RevPro's High Stakes Event, Aussie Open joined Undisputed British Heavyweight Championship Will Ospreay in attacking The Young Guns and Shota Umino, joining the United Empire stable and turning heel. The three consistently began teaming as a trio across the UK. They lost the championships to Roy Knight and Ricky Knight Jr, ending their reign at 63 days. On April 10, 2022, Aussie Open, made their NJPW Strong debuts, teaming with fellow United Empire stablemate, Jeff Cobb to defeat TMDK. On April 16 at Windy City Riot, Aussie Open and Cobb, teamed with fellow stablemates, Great-O-Khan, T. J. Perkins and Aaron Henare to defeat Bullet Club representatives, The Good Brothers (Doc Gallows and Karl Anderson), Chris Bey, El Phantasmo and guest member Scott Norton in a 12-man tag-team match. At Capital Collision, Cobb, Henare and Aussie Open lost to TMDK in an 8-man tag-team match.

On the June 19th edition of NJPW Strong Ignition, Aussie Open competed in a tournament to crown the inaugural Strong Openweight Tag Team Championship. In the first round, they defeated The Dark Order's Evil Uno and Alan Angels and they defeated the Stray Dog Army in the semi-finals. In the finals at Strong: High Alert, Fletcher and Davis defeated Christopher Daniels and Yuya Uemura to become the inaugural champions.

At Music City Mayhem, Aussie Open teamed with T. J. Perkins to defeat the team of Alex Zayne and the IWGP Tag Team Champions, FTR. After the match, Aussie Open challenged FTR to a match for the IWGP Tag Team Championships. They received their match at Royal Quest II, where they lost to FTR. At Rumble on 44th Street, Aussie Open lost the Strong Openweight Tag Team Championships to The Motor City Machine Guns in a three-way tag-team match also involving The DKC and Kevin Knight, ending their inaugural reign at 76 days.

All Elite Wrestling & Ring of Honor (2022–present)

On the June 8th episode of Dynamite, Aussie Open and Aaron Henare made their All Elite Wrestling debuts, aiding Will Ospreay in attacking FTR and Trent Beretta, who Cobb and O-Khan had attacked two weeks prior. They made their in-ring debuts on the June 10th edition of Rampage, where they and Ospreay lost to FTR and Beretta in a 6-man tag-team match. Aussie Open returned on the June 15th special Road Rager edition of Dynamite attacking FTR and Roppongi Vice (Beretta and Rocky Romero) after Ospreay, defeated FTR's Dax Harwood, however, they were stopped by Orange Cassidy who was announced to face Ospreay at AEWxNJPW: Forbidden Door for Ospreay's IWGP United States Championship, along with O-Khan and Cobb facing FTR and Roppongi Vice in a triple threat tag-team match, for both Cobb and O-Khan's IWGP Heavyweight Tag Team Championships and FTR's ROH World Tag Team Championships . At the event, Aussie Open accompanied Ospreay to the ring for his match against Cassidy, often assisting Ospreay during the match. Ospreay eventually retained the championship, and along with Aussie Open, attacked Cassidy and Roppongi Vice after the match. However, Ospreay and Aussie Open were interrupted by Katsuyori Shibata, who beat down the trio, saving Cassidy and Roppongi Vice.

On July 27, the AEW World Trios Championship was revealed, Aussie Open and Ospreay being named as participants in the inaugural tournament. On August 24, Aussie Open and Ospreay defeated Death Triangle to progress to the semifinals, where they were defeated by The Elite (The Young Bucks and Kenny Omega) on August 31. After the match, United Empire attacked The Elite.

Fletcher and Davis returned to AEW on the February 22 edition of Dynamite, competing in the Revolution Tag Team Battle Royal, but failed to win. On the same weeks edition of Rampage, Davis and Fletcher lost to The Young Bucks. The following week on Dynamite, Aussie Open competed in the Casino Tag Team Royale, but again failed to win.

On March 9, Fletcher and Davis made their debut for AEW's sister promotion Ring of Honor (ROH), defeating Rhett Titus and Tracy Williams.

Championships and accomplishments 
ATTACK! Pro Wrestling
ATTACK! 24:7 Championship (4 times)
ATTACK! Tag Team Championship (2 times) - with Mark Davis
Defiant Wrestling
Defiant Tag Team Championship (2 times) - with Mark Davis
Fight Club: PRO
 FCP Tag Team Championship (1 time) - with Chris Brookes
HOPE Wrestling
HOPE 24/7 Hardcore Championship (4 times)
HOPE Tag Team Championship (1 time) - with Mark Davis
New Japan Pro Wrestling
Strong Openweight Tag Team Championship (1 time, inaugural) - with Mark Davis
Inaugural Strong Openweight Tag Team Championship Tournament - with Mark Davis
Over The Top Wrestling
OTT Tag Team Championship (1 time) - with Mark Davis
PROGRESS Wrestling
 PROGRESS Tag Team Championship (2 times) - with Mark Davis
 Pro Wrestling Illustrated
 Ranked No. 378 of the top 500 singles wrestlers in the PWI 500 in 2020
PWA Black Label
 PWA Tag Team Championship (1 time) - with Mark Davis
Revolution Pro Wrestling
 Undisputed British Tag Team Championship (2 times) - with Mark Davis
Road To Royal Quest Tag Team Tournament (2019)
RevPro Undisputed British Tag Team Title #1 Contendership Tournament (2018–19)
Westside Xtreme Wrestling
 wXw World Tag Team Championship (2 times) - with Mark Davis

References

External links 
 Kyle Fletcher Profile at Online World of Wrestling
 
 
 

1998 births
Living people
Sportspeople from Sydney
Sportsmen from New South Wales
Australian male professional wrestlers
Australian expatriate sportspeople in the United States
Expatriate professional wrestlers
21st-century professional wrestlers
PROGRESS Tag Team Champions
Undisputed British Tag Team Champions